"Turn Left" is a 2008 episode of the TV series Doctor Who.

Turn Left may also refer to:

 Turn Left (newspaper), now The Cornell Progressive, a student publication at Cornell University
 Turn Left, a Canadian newspaper published by the New Democratic Party Socialist Caucus
 NASCAR, or the National Association for Stock Car Auto Racing, a motorsport where participants largely turn left.

See also 
 Left Turn, a bimonthly activist news magazine
 Linkswende (Left Turn), a Trotskyist group in Austria